Asbestos Falls is a waterfall on Clear Creek in Snohomish County, Washington.  It is located just above the mouth of Helena Creek.  

The falls are about 55 feet high and drop that in two segments, only one of which is easily seen from the rim of the canyon the falls drop into.  To reach the far segment, one would have to descend into the canyon, which is dangerous enough before fording the creek, which would also be dangerous, especially during high water.  

Reaching the falls requires a moderately difficult bushwhack to the edge of the canyon from just past Asbestos Creek Falls, which is countless times confused with Asbestos Falls.  

The falls are also simply known as Clear Creek Falls, but the official name is Asbestos Falls.

References

Waterfalls of Snohomish County, Washington
Waterfalls of Washington (state)